Ross Parke (born February 18, 1932 in Winnipeg, Manitoba) was a Canadian ice hockey amateur forward. Ross was on the Detroit Red Wing's negotiation list, but maintained his amateur status and played in the Memorial Cup in 1951 with the Winnipeg Monarchs. For the next four years, he played with Michigan State University in the NCAA and was the team leading scorer for three consecutive years. From there, he played with the Winnipeg Maroons winning the Allan Cup in 1964. He also played in the World Championships for Canada's National team in 1965 in Tampere, Finland. In 1972, Ross played in Russia with the Canadian Old Timers against the Soviet Old Timers.

In October 2017, Ross Parke was inducted into the Manitoba Hockey Hall of Fame.

Awards and achievements 
1951: Winnipeg Monarch Junior Abbott Cup Champions
1951: Winnipeg Monarch Junior Memorial Cup Finalist against Barrie Flyers
1952 Winnipeg Monarch Junior Allstar
1953: Milwaukee Chiefs – International League- farm team of Detroit Red Wings
1954-58: Michigan State University NCAA hockey-team leading scorer 3 consecutive years
1961: Represented Canada in Czechoslovakia tour
1961: Winnipeg Maroons - Patton Memorial Cup Champions
1963: Winnipeg Maroons – Patton Memorial Cup Champions
1964: MVP in Geneva tournament ( Russia, Czechoslovakia, Wpg Maroons)scored 6 goals in one game
1964: Allan Cup Champions. Leading scorer in total points for series
1965: Canada's National Team – World Hockey tournament in Tampere, Finland
1966: Coached the River Heights Midget Team  - City Champions
1967: Coached the River Heights Juvenile Team – City and Provincial Champions
1972: Played in Russia with the Canadian Old Timers

References

1932 births
Living people
Canadian ice hockey forwards
Ice hockey people from Winnipeg
Winnipeg Monarchs players
Winnipeg Maroons players
Michigan State Spartans men's ice hockey players